Glenfair Park is a  public park in northeastern Portland, Oregon. The park was acquired in 1989.

References

External links

 

1989 establishments in Oregon
Northeast Portland, Oregon
Parks in Portland, Oregon